Rhopalephora is a genus of monocotyledonous flowering plants in the family Commelinaceae, first described in 1864. It is native to Asia, Madagascar, and a few islands in the Pacific.

 Species
 Rhopalephora micrantha (Vahl) Faden - Java
 Rhopalephora rugosa (H.Perrier) Faden - Madagascar
 Rhopalephora scaberrima (Blume) Faden - China (including Taiwan + Tibet), Indian Subcontinent, Indochina, Borneo, Java, Philippines
 Rhopalephora vitiensis (Seem.) Faden - Maluku, Fiji, Samoa, Tonga

References

Commelinaceae
Commelinales genera